The Challenge 1932 was the third FAI International Tourist Plane Competition, that took place between 12  and August 28, 1932 in Berlin, Germany. The four Challenges, from 1929 to 1934, were major aviation events in pre-war Europe.

Overview
Germany organized the contest, because German pilot Fritz Morzik won the previous Challenge in 1930. The number of aircraft that took part in the 1932 Challenge was smaller - 43 compared to 60, because the contest was getting much more difficult with time, demanding high pilotage skills and more advanced aircraft. This time, most countries developed new aircraft specifically for the Challenge. There were 67 entries reported, but as much as 24 aircraft did not show up, partly because of unfinished development or crashes during tests.

Teams from six countries entered the Challenge in 1932: Germany (16 crews), France (8 crews), Italy (8 crews), Poland (5 crews), Czechoslovakia (4 crews) and Switzerland (2 crews). English aviator Winifred Spooner entered the contest in the Italian team, being the only woman among the pilots. One Canadian (John Carberry) and one Romanian pilot (Alexander Papana) entered the contest in the German team.

The opening ceremony was on August 12, 1932 at Berlin-Staaken airfield. The contest consisted of three parts: technical trials, a rally around Europe and a maximum speed test. Since one of the aims of the Challenge was to stimulate progress in aircraft development, it was not only pilots' competition, but technical trials also included a construction evaluation that promoted more advanced designs.

Aircraft
 
The Challenge was to be a contest of tourist aircraft, so competing aircraft had to be able to take at least two persons aboard, take off and land on a short field and cover a distance with a good cruising speed. In fact, Germany, Poland, Czechoslovakia and Italy developed modern sports aircraft specifically to meet the demands of the Challenge. Before the contest, a favourite was German Messerschmitt's BFW M.29, offering the highest performance, but due to two crashes during training, all BFWs were withdrawn. Their place as German favourites was taken by six fast Heinkel He 64s. Most numerous German aircraft was the three-seater Klemm Kl 32 (7 plus one in Swiss team). Both were wooden low-wing monoplanes. Italy and Czechoslovakia developed similar strutted low-wing monoplanes, the Breda Ba.33 and Praga BH-111. Poland developed a high-wing RWD-6 and an all-metal low-wing monoplane PZL.19. All these aircraft had enclosed crew cabins, fixed landing gear and advanced wing mechanization (flaps and slat). The other aircraft, especially French, modified from serial designs, were less modern and had lower chances in technical trials.

Aircraft participating were: Klemm Kl 32 (8), Breda Ba.33 (8), Heinkel He 64 (6), Praga BH-111 (3), PZL.19 (3), RWD-6 (2), Potez 43 (2), Farman 234 (2), Farman 353 (1), Darmstadt D-22a (1), Raab-Katzenstein RK-25/32 (1), Breda Ba.15S (1), Monocoupe 110 (1), Guerchais T.9 (1), Caudron C.278 (1), Mauboussin M.112 (1), Comte AC-12 (1).

The German aircraft had starting numbers from a range: A4-A9, B1-B9, C2-C8, E1-E2, French: K1-K8, Italian: M1-M8, Polish: O1-O6, Swiss: S1-S2, Czechoslovak: T1-T4 (numbers were placed on fuselages in a black square frame).

Technical trials
On August 13 the technical evaluation of the competing planes' construction took place. Since it was a tourist plane contest, features such as: a comfortable cabin with a good view, seats placed side-by-side, a rich set of controls, modern construction, safety devices and folding wings were also awarded points. Most points were given to the Polish designs (86 points to the RWD-6 and 84 points to the PZL.19), behind them the Italian Breda Ba.33 (83 points) and Praga BH-111 (80 points). This gave them more than ten points' advantage over most feared German designs (Kl 32 - 71-72 points, He 64c - 66 points), and placed them as favourites from this point. Worst planes scored 44 points (Caudron C.278 biplane and Mauboussin M.12).

The first trial was a minimal speed trial, to evaluate the aircraft safety, which was new in Challenge contests. Flying on the edge of stalling, Franciszek Żwirko was the slowest with 57.6 km/h speed, the second was another Pole flying an RWD-6, Tadeusz Karpiński. Behind them were the Italians, the German He 64s and the French Raymond Delmotte (C.278) with good results ranging from 61.2 to 65.7 km/h, and then the rest. The regulations did not expect such low speeds and therefore all seven results below 63 km/h were awarded with 50 points.

Next there were trials of a short take off and landing, carried out in groups until 17 August 1932. The short take-off trial required the crews to fly over an 8-m high gate. The German pilot Wolfram Hirth (Kl 32) was the best, taking off from the closest distance (91.6m - 40 pts), two Italians Colombo and Lombardi scored 40 points as well, other Klemms and Bredas were also at the head. Polish RWD-6s scored 37 points (111.5 and 115 m).

Next, a short landing trial followed, from behind an 8 m high gate. The best result, 92.4 m (40 pts), was achieved by Winifred Spooner. Good results were scored by Klemms, Bredas, RWD-6s and French Potez 43s. After the technical evaluation and these two trials, the leaders in the general classification were: the Italian Ambrogio Colombo and the Pole Franciszek Żwirko on the RWD-6. The next places were taken by an Italian team, then by the Germans and Poles, then the rest.

August 16 saw a trial of quick folding of wings, which was a feature to save place in hangars, and then a trial of quick engine starting. The general classification changed little after these trials, with Żwirko and Colombo holding on to a joint lead with 222 points each.

A fuel consumption trial on a 300 km distance was held on August 19, and the German aircraft won in that category. After all technical trials, Ambrogio Colombo led the general classification, with Franciszek Żwirko second, Italy's Francesco Lombardi third.

Before the next part, Winifred Spooner was forced to land near Berlin due to sabotage of her fuel, and she decided to withdraw.

Rally over Europe

The second part of the Challenge was a 7363 km rally over Europe, on a path: Berlin - Warsaw - Kraków - Prague - Brno – Vienna - Zagreb - Postumia (checkpoint) - Vicenza - Rimini - Rome - Florence - Bellinzona - Torino – Albenga (checkpoint) – Imperia (checkpoint) - Cannes - Lyon - St. Gallen - Stuttgart - Bonn - Paris - Deauville – Rotterdam - Dortmund – Hamburg - Copenhagen – Laholm (checkpoint) - Gothenburg - Laholm (checkpoint) - Copenhagen - Hamburg – Berlin. 39 aircraft took part in the race. Main waypoints were Rome and Paris. Longest section was Berlin – Warsaw (518 km), the shortest - Brno – Vienna (106.4 km).

The rally started on August 21. From the beginning, the German crews tried to take advantage of faster aircraft and make up for the points lost in the technical trials. The Italians tried to be the first in Rome, racing against the Germans. On the other side, the Poles, with slower planes, tried to keep a good cruise speed and flight regularity, which were awarded with points in the rally. On the first day, most crews reached Vienna or Zagreb, while the Italians reached Vicenza. Ambrogio Colombo and three Germans (von Massenbach, Seidemann and Marienfeld) got as far as Rimini. Three crews withdrew on the way due to breakdowns.
On August 22, the competitors landed in Rome, but the German pilot Hans Seidemann was first. Only 33 crews reached Rome, three had forced crash landings (among others, the Romanian Aleksander Papana flying Monocoupe 110).

On August 23, the competitors took off from Rome. On that day, two Italian Bredas crashed due to weak wing construction (one mechanic died bailing out). As a result, Italy decided to withdraw all the Italian teams from the Challenge, Ambrogio Colombo being the leader by then. On August 24, the 25 remaining crews reached Paris. On August 27, the competitors finished in Berlin. The first pilot in Berlin, and the fastest in the whole race, was the German Hans Seidemann with a cruise speed of 213 km/h, flying the Heinkel He 64b. The next seven results were also German. Franciszek Żwirko arrived in 11th place, with a cruise speed of 191 km/h.

After the technical trials and the rally, Franciszek Żwirko held first place in the general classification with 456 points, with Reinhold Poss in second with 451 pts, Wolf Hirth in third with 450 pts and Robert Fretz (Suiss) in fourth with 448 pts. Fritz Morzik was fifth with 444 pts.

Maximum speed trial
The last part of the Challenge was a maximum speed trial, on a 300 km triangular course. The beginning and landing was on August 28 at the Berlin-Staaken airfield.

The fastest was the German Fritz Morzik (He 64c) with 241.3 km/h. The next four places were also occupied by Heinkels. Żwirko's closest rival, Reinhold Poss flying a Klemm Kl 32, was in 7th position (220.7 km/h). The fastest Pole was Tadeusz Karpiński (8th position, 216.2 km/h, RWD-6), while Franciszek Żwirko took the 13th position with 214.1 km/h.

Due to a handicapping system, contestants took off in order of general classification, with proper intervals, and a number of points given in the speed trial meant that the first on the finish line would be the winner of all contest. As a result, minutes could decide the final victory in the Challenge. Taking off 12 minutes after Żwirko, Morzik landed 83 seconds after him - if he had overrun Żwirko, he would have won. Poss, starting five minutes after the leader, was 2 minutes 30 seconds short.

Results
A closing ceremony was held after the maximum speed test on August 28. The winners were the Polish crew: pilot Franciszek Żwirko and mechanic Stanisław Wigura, with 461 points. Their success was not only a result of their aviation skills, but also of the technical features of their Polish-designed RWD-6 (which Wigura had co-designed). Due to Żwirko's victory, the next Challenge 1934 was organized in Warsaw.

The second and third place was occupied jointly by Germans: Fritz Morzik (Heinkel He 64c, the winner of the Challenge 1930) and Reinhold Poss (Klemm Kl 32V) with 458 points. The 5th place was taken by Switzerland's Robert Frenz flying German Klemm Kl 32. Tadeusz Karpiński flying the other RWD-6, took the 9th place. The best Czech, Josef Kalla, took 16th place, the best French contestant, Raymond Delmotte - 20th place. The Challenge was completed by only 24 crews out of 43 (12 German, 4 Polish, 4 French, 3 Czechoslovak and 1 Swiss).

The first prize in the Challenge was 100,000 French franc, the 2nd - 50,000 FRF, the 3rd - 25,000 FRF, the 4th - 13,000 FRF, 16 other crews would get 7,000 FRF.

Less than a month after the Challenge, Franciszek Zwirko and Stanislaw Wigura died in an accident, flying their RWD-6 to Czechoslovakia in a storm on September 11, 1932. Reinhold Poss also died in an accident in 1933. Winifred Spooner died the same year.

See also
Challenge International de Tourisme
Challenge 1929
Challenge 1930
Challenge 1934

References

Marian Krzyżan: "Międzynarodowe turnieje lotnicze 1929-1934", Warsaw 1988,   (Polish language)
 International Touring Competition in: Flight, Nr. 1234, 19 August 1932, pp. 771–773
 Edwin Heinze, The International Touring Competition in Flight, 26 August 1932, Nr. 1235, pp. 803-808
 Edwin Heinze, The International Touring Competition in Flight, 2 September 1932, Nr. 1236, pp. 826–830

External links
Edwin P.A. Heinze, The International Touring Competition in Flight, August 26, 1932
Edwin P.A. Heinze, The International Touring Competition in Flight, September 2, 1932

1932 in sports
Aviation competitions and awards
1932 in German motorsport
1930s in Berlin
Aviation history of Germany